Calcium-dependent phospholipase A2 is an enzyme that in humans is encoded by the PLA2G5 gene.

This gene is a member of the secretory phospholipase A2 family. It is located in a tightly-linked cluster of secretory phospholipase A2 genes on chromosome 1. The encoded enzyme catalyzes the hydrolysis of membrane phospholipids to generate lysophospholipids and free fatty acids including arachidonic acid. It preferentially hydrolyzes linoleoyl-containing phosphatidylcholine substrates. Secretion of this enzyme is thought to induce inflammatory responses in neighboring cells. Alternatively spliced transcript variants have been found, but their full-length nature has not been determined.

References

Further reading